"If I Only Had Time" is a song recorded by the New Zealand singer John Rowles in 1968 that became a worldwide hit single. It is based on a French song "Je n'aurai pas le temps" by Michel Fugain. Rowles' song was his first release in the UK where it reached number 3 in the chart.

Background
"If I Only Had Time" is an English version of "Je n'aurai pas le temps", a French ballad written by Michel Fugain and Pierre Delanoë, and recorded by Fugain. Fugain's recording was released as a single and charted in 1967.

Manager Peter Gormley signed the New Zealander John Rowles to MCA in London, and for his first record release in the UK, Mike Leander was chosen to produce and arrange the song. New lyrics in English were written by Jack Fishman. It was released in the UK on 17 February 1968.
 
Rowles' song peaked number 3 in the UK, number 2 in New Zealand, Belgium and the Netherlands, number 15 in Germany, and number 17 in Austria. It also performed well in the Australian cities, registering at number 5 in Sydney, number 14 in Melbourne, number 3 in Brisbane, number 6 in Adelaide and number 7 in Perth.

The song was re-released in 1988 on the Old Gold label. It was backed with "Hush Not A Word To Mary".

Charts

Other versions
 Jean-Claude Pascal recorded "Je n'aurai pas le temps" for his album Chansons d'hier et de toujours in 1967.
 Nick DeCaro released an instrumental version of "If I Only Had Time" as a single in 1968, and it reached No. 95 on the Billboard Hot 100, and 12 on the Easy Listening chart in 1969. It is included in his 1969 album Happy Heart.

References

John Rowles songs
1968 singles
1968 songs
MCA Records singles
Songs written by Pierre Delanoë
Song recordings produced by Mike Leander